The Treffry Viaduct is a historic dual-purpose railway viaduct and aqueduct located close to the village of Luxulyan, Cornwall in the United Kingdom. The viaduct crosses the Luxulyan Valley, and with it forms an integral part of the Cornwall and West Devon Mining Landscape, a World Heritage Site. It is scheduled under the Ancient Monuments and Archaeological Areas Act 1979 and due to its poor condition is on Historic England's, Heritage at Risk Register.

History

In 1813, Joseph Austen inherited the estates of the Treffry family on the death of his mother's brother (he changed his name to Treffry in 1838). He began to develop the assets, particularly the mineral wealth, and saw that the Luxulyan Valley was a convenient route between the south coast and the high ground in mid Cornwall. He built a new artificial harbour, completed in 1829, at Par, a canal up the valley to Ponts Mill and an inclined plane railway to the Fowey Consols mine on Penpillick Hill. To bring water power to the mine he built a leat from Luxulyan along the west side of the valley. He also acquired the moribund port of Newquay and land and mines in the area of Goss Moor, and planned to link them by a railway system.

Work began in 1835 on a tramway up the valley, but Austen and his steward William Pease realised that it was not going to meet their ambitions, so it was abandoned and only a few fragments of the route are visible today. Instead, they built a much larger-scale tramway, with the inclined plane from the canal basin, past the Carmears Rocks, to the level of the top of the valley, then a level run through Luxulyan and on to its terminus at the Bugle Inn near Mollinis. This required a high-level crossing of the river, for which they built the great viaduct, 650 feet (198 m) long and 100 feet (30 m) high, the most advanced engineering project in the western peninsula. It was built of stone from the Carbeans and Colcerrow quarries, and the lines from the quarries to the viaduct were the first parts of the tramway to be operational. The tramway was completed in 1844.

The viaduct carried both rails and a water channel to bring more water for the Fowey Consols, and this is where the quality of the design and construction becomes apparent. The level of a waterway must be precisely correct, or the water will not flow.

On its way down, the water was used to power the Carmears incline, by means of a water wheel, 34 feet (10 m) in diameter. This enabled the tramway to work loads up the incline, against gravity.

The last improvement Joseph Treffry made was a continuation of the railway alongside the canal to Par Harbour, but this was not completed until after his untimely death in 1850.

Two more granite quarries were at work within the Valley, Rock Mill and Orchard. In 1870 the South Cornwall Granite company opened a railway linking these to Ponts Mill. This is what we now call the Valley Floor Tramway - the Treffry era railways, all horse-worked, were later called tramways to distinguish them from later locomotive-powered lines. The quarries were worked until about 1928; the last stone came from Carbeans in 1933 and the last of Treffry's rails were removed in 1940.

In 1872 a group of London businessmen began a massive rebuild of Treffry's tramways to enable them to exploit the ironstone deposits near Newquay. They constructed a new route through the Valley, which left the old one below Ponts Mill, ascended the west side of the Valley, crossed the River Par twice on the Ponts Mill and Rock Mill Viaducts, passed under the Treffry Viaduct, approached Luxulyan through a tunnel and rejoined the old route at Luxulyan railway station. The new consortium was called the Cornwall Minerals Railway.

Visiting
It is free to visit the viaduct and open all year round. It can be walked across and viewed from across the valley.

There is car parking at the bottom of the valley at Ponts Mill which is just off the A390 road at Porcupine, or at the top of the valley just north of the Treffry Viaduct, where there is a junction. There are also many walks to the viaduct from St Blazey village and from Luxulyan railway station on the Newquay branch line which passes beneath the viaduct.

Film and television
The BBC television programme Seven Man Made Wonders, which was broadcast in 2006, featured the viaduct.

References

General:

External links

 Scheduled Ancient Monument

Railway viaducts in Cornwall
Aqueducts in England
Industrial archaeological sites in Cornwall
Scheduled monuments in Cornwall
Structures on the Heritage at Risk register